Walmajarri (many other names; see below) is a Pama–Nyungan language spoken in the Kimberley region of Western Australia by the Walmadjari and related peoples.

Walmajarri is declared a definitely endangered language by UNESCO based on their scale of Language Vitality and Endangerment.

Names
Names for this language break down along the three dialects:
Walmajarri, Walmatjarri, Walmatjari, Walmadjari, Walmatjiri, Walmajiri, Walmatjeri, Walmadjeri, Walmadyeri, Walmaharri, Wolmeri, Wolmera, Wulmari
Bililuna, Pililuna
Jiwarliny, Juwaliny, Tjiwaling, Tjiwarlin

Speakers

Communities with a Walmajarri population are:
 Bayulu
 Djugerari (Cherrabun)
 Junjuwa (Fitzroy Crossing)
 Looma
 Kadjina (Millijidee)
 Mindibungu (Bililuna)
 Mindi Rardi (Fitzroy Crossing)
 Mulan
 Ngumpan
 Wangkajungka (Christmas Creek)
 Yakanarra
 Yungngora

The Walmajarri people used to live in the Great Sandy Desert. The effects of colonialism took them to the cattle stations, towns and missions in the North and scattered them over a wide area. The geographical distance accounts for the fact that there are several dialects, which have been further polarised by the lack of contact and further influenced by neighbouring languages.

Phonology

Vowels

Consonants

Consonants are allowed as the final sound of a word in most cases.

Morphology
Warlmajarri is a suffixing language. There are no prefixes.

At least one dictionary of Walmajarri is available online, compiled by Eirlys Richards and Joyce Hudson.

Syntax
Warlmajarri has four syntactic cases: nominative, ergative, dative and assessory case. The cases assign different meanings to the noun phrases of a sentence. Therefore, the word order can vary quite freely. Subject, Object or Verb can appear initial, final, medial in sentence.

However, the second position of a sentence is always reserved for the Verbal Auxiliary. Sometimes referred to as a Catalyst, the Verbal Auxiliary indicates the mood of a sentence (similar to the English auxiliaries), but also cross-references its noun phrases. The person and number of the noun phrases in their syntactic cases are shown in the Verbal Auxiliary.

Resources 
Some resources of the language spoken can be found in various archives or databases, such as the Pacific and Regional Archive for Digital Sources in Endangered Cultures (PARADISEC) catalogue.

See also
Ngurrara, a grouping of peoples of language groups including Walmajarri

References

Bibliography
 Hudson, Joyce. (1978). The Walmatjari: An Introduction to the Language and Culture. Darwin: Summer Institute of Linguistics
 Hudson, Joyce. (1978). The core of Walmatjari grammar. Australian Institute of Aboriginal Studies. New Jersey, U.S.A.: Humanities Press Inc.
 Hudson, Joyce & Richards, Eirlys. (1969). The phonology of Walmatjari.
 Hudson, Joyce & Richards, Eirlys. (1990). Walmajarri–English Dictionary. Darwin: Summer Institute of Linguistics

External links
Handbook of Western Australian languages South of the Kimberly (Walmajarri)

Ngumbin languages
Endangered indigenous Australian languages in Western Australia